The Frederiksen II Cabinet (colloquially, the SVM government (Danish: SVM-regeringen) took office on 15 December 2022 and succeeded the Frederiksen I Cabinet following the 2022 Danish general election. Headed by Prime Minister Mette Frederiksen, it is a grand coalition consisting of the Social Democrats, Venstre, and the Moderates. It was announced on 13 December following a record 42 days of negotiations. The government is supported by the Union Party and the Social Democratic Party from the Faroe Islands, as well as Siumut and Inuit Ataqatigiit from Greenland. The Social Liberals has also said that it intends to be neither a supporting party nor part of the opposition. As the government has 89 of the 179 seats in the Folketing, it effectively operates as a majority government.

It is the first time in more than 40 years the Social Democrats and the Liberals (Venstre), who are usually rivals, are in a government together.

List of ministers

Notes

References

Cabinets of Denmark
2022 establishments in Denmark
Cabinets established in 2022
Current governments